Gary Buckland (born 12 June 1986) is a Welsh former professional boxer who competed from 2005 to 2016. He held the British super featherweight title from 2011 to 2013. He also challenged for the British and EBU European lightweight titles in 2010; the British super featherweight title in 2013; and the Commonwealth lightweight title in 2014.

Professional career
Buckland's professional debut came on 5 March 2005 with a four-round points win over Warren Dunkley at the Goresbrook Leisure Centre in Dagenham. He fought three more times that year scoring wins on each occasion and fighting in London, Plymouth and Bristol.  Five fights the following year in 2006 resulted in five more wins including two victories over Judex Meema and a trip to Spain for a points win over Ubadel Soto.  On 3 March 2007 in his first fight of the year and now boasting an unbeaten record of 9–0 Buckland defeated Stuart Phillips at the Newport Leisure Centre to win the Welsh Area title. A win over journeyman Carl Allen followed before on 5 October 2007 Buckland defeated Martin Watson over 10 rounds to lift the Celtic version of the lightweight title.

Defeat and regroup
Now with a record of 11–0, Buckland begun 2008 with wins over journeymen Alex Spitko and Ali Wyatt before on 13 June 2008 losing for the first time to Hove's Ben Murphy in a six-round points defeat.  Buckland bounced back from the defeat on 27 February 2009 travelling to Barnsley and scoring a 10-round shut out against Craig Docherty in another Celtic title fight.  His next contest was to be an eliminator for the full British title with England's Henry Castle his opponent. The fight in Newport resulted in another 10 round points win for Buckland against a man who had recently impressed with wins over Graham Earl, Ryan Barrett and Kevin O'Hara. A first round win over Hungarian Istvan Nagy on 13 November 2009 topped off a successful year for the Welshman.

British and European title challenge
On 19 February 2010 Buckland scored possibly his biggest win to date with a 12-round victory in a Commonwealth title eliminator against Uganda's Sam Rukundo.  Rukundo, based in Sweden, was undefeated with 15 wins and only one draw before losing that record to Buckland at a fight in Stoke. Already in contention for a shot at the British title, the win had put him in the frame for a shot at the European title too.  His opponent for both titles on 7 May 2010 was the current European number one contender and British champion, John Murray.  The fight took place at the Kingsway Leisure Center in Widnes and ended with a second career defeat for Buckland with Murray proving to be just too strong, winning in the 11th round.

Prizefighter win
On 20 November 2010 Buckland moved down to super featherweight and competed in the 15th prizefighter competition shown live on Sky Sports.  The Barry Hearn promoted tournament pitched 8 fighters in a knock out style competition over one evening with the winner walking away with prize money of £32,000.  In the quarter finals Buckland was matched against former amateur star Steven Bell winning over 3 rounds on all the judges scorecards. In the semi-final Buckland pulled off one of the upsets of the year with a first-round knockout of the pre-tournament favourite and reigning British champion Gary Sykes.  In the final Buckland met Derry Mathews the former WBU champion and former young boxer of the year.  Mathews had beaten Gary McArthur by stoppage in the quarters and then engaged in a gruelling contest with Choi Tseveenpurev in the semis to book his place in the final.  The fight resulted in another stoppage win for Buckland with a devastating punch to the solar plexus in the 2nd round proving too much for Mathews to recover from.  Of his win Buckland said "I'm feeling on top of the world".  He added "I'd done a good 10 weeks of training and I knew it was going to be a hard competition. This is the best thing that has ever happened to me, so far."

British champion
Buckland followed up his Prizefighter win with a victory over Oscar Chacin at the MEN Arena on 16 April 2011 and travelling to Mexico to beat Jose Roberto Gonzalez on 18 June 2011. His opportunity to fight for the super featherweight version of the British title came on 24 September 2011, with Buckland beating reigning champion Gary Sykes in a close back and forth contest over 12 rounds.

Professional boxing record

References

Welsh male boxers
Lightweight boxers
Super-featherweight boxers
Prizefighter contestants
1986 births
Living people
People from Rumney, Cardiff
Boxers from Cardiff
Romani sportspeople
Welsh Romani people